The Pipe Dreams of Instant Prince Whippet is a 2002 EP by Guided by Voices. It collects the b-sides of the singles from their 2002 album Universal Truths and Cycles, in addition to two unreleased songs.

Track listing
"Visit This Place" - 2:35 - B-side of Cheyenne 7" 
"Swooping Energies" - 1:47
"Keep It Coming" - 2:40 - B-side of Everywhere With Helicopter CD single 
"Action Speaks Volumes" - 3:23 - B-side of Everywhere With Helicopter 7" 
"Stronger Lizards" - 0:55 
"The Pipe Dreams of Instant Prince Whippet" - 1:32 - B-side of Everywhere With Helicopter CD single 
"Request Pharmaceuticals" - 2:12 - B-side of Back to the Lake CD single 
"For Liberty" - 0:54 - B-side of Back to the Lake CD single 
"Dig Through My Window" - 3:51 - B-side of Back to the Lake 7"
"Beg for a Wheelbarrow" - 3:15 - B-side of Universal Truths and Cycles 7"

2002 EPs
Guided by Voices EPs